Michael Dunn (born August 28, 1994) is an American football guard for the Cleveland Browns of the National Football League (NFL). He played college football at Maryland.

Personal life
Dunn was born in Bethesda, Maryland, and is Jewish. He attended Walt Whitman High School in Bethesda. He played college football at Maryland.

Dunn married The Athletic podcast producer Marissa Morris, whom he started dating in 2016, in March 2022.

Professional career

Los Angeles Rams
After going undrafted in the 2017 NFL Draft, Dunn had a rookie minicamp tryout with the Los Angeles Rams in May 2017. He signed with the team on June 15, 2017. He was waived during final roster cuts on September 2, 2017, and signed to the Rams' practice squad the following day. Dunn was released from the Rams' practice squad on September 5, 2017.

Dunn re-signed with the Rams on February 22, 2018. He was waived on June 5, 2018.

Jacksonville Jaguars
Dunn signed with the Jacksonville Jaguars on July 31, 2018. He was waived during final roster cuts on September 1, 2018, and signed to the team's practice squad on September 19, 2018. He was released on October 16, 2018, and re-signed to the practice squad on November 27, 2018.

Birmingham Iron
Dunn signed with the Birmingham Iron of the Alliance of American Football (AAF) on January 15, 2019.

Miami Dolphins
After the AAF suspended league operations eight weeks into its season, Dunn was signed by the Miami Dolphins on April 9, 2019. He was waived during final roster cuts on August 31, 2019.

Seattle Dragons
Dunn was drafted by the Seattle Dragons of the XFL in the sixth round of the second phase of the 2020 XFL Draft on October 15, 2019. He had his contract terminated when the league suspended operations on April 10, 2020.

Cleveland Browns
Dunn was signed by the Cleveland Browns on August 9, 2020. He was waived during final roster cuts on September 5, 2020, and signed to their practice squad the next day. Dunn was elevated to the active roster on November 14, November 21, November 28, and December 19 for the team's weeks 10, 11, 12, and 15 games against the Houston Texans, Philadelphia Eagles, Jacksonville Jaguars, and New York Giants, and reverted to the practice squad after each game. He was signed to the Browns' active roster on December 23, 2020.

Dunn's first career start came on January 10, 2021, in the Browns' 48-37 playoff victory against the Pittsburgh Steelers. Dunn started after left guard Joel Bitonio tested positive for COVID-19. Dunn did not allow a single pressure in pass protection. On January 12, 2021, Dunn was placed on injured reserve.

On August 31, 2021, Dunn was named in the Browns 53-man opening day roster for the 2021 season.

The Browns placed an exclusive-rights free agent tender on Dunn on March 7, 2022. He was placed on injured reserve on November 19.

See also
List of select Jewish football players

References

External links
Cleveland Browns bio

1994 births
Living people
People from Bethesda, Maryland
Players of American football from Maryland
American football offensive guards
American football offensive tackles
Maryland Terrapins football players
Los Angeles Rams players
Jacksonville Jaguars players
Birmingham Iron players
Miami Dolphins players
Seattle Dragons players
Sportspeople from Montgomery County, Maryland
Cleveland Browns players
Jewish American sportspeople
21st-century American Jews
Walt Whitman High School (Maryland) alumni